is a train station in Kobayashi, Miyazaki Prefecture, Japan. It is operated by JR Kyushu and is on the Kitto Line.

Lines

Layout 
The station consists of an island platform serving two tracks at grade with sidings branching off track 2. The station building is a steel frame cuboidal structure located next to the island platform in between the two tracks. It houses an automatic ticket vending machine and a staffed ticket window. After the ticket gate, a short flight of steps and a ramp leads up to the island platform. Access to the station building is possible from access roads on both sides of the tracks by means of a level crossing.

Management of the passenger facilities at the station has been outsourced to the JR Kyushu Tetsudou Eigyou Co., a wholly owned subsidiary of JR Kyushu specialising in station services. It staffs the ticket booth which is equipped with a POS machine but does not have a Midori no Madoguchi facility.

Adjacent stations

History
The station was opened by Japanese Government Railways (JGR) on 1 October 1912 with the name   as the eastern terminus of a line from  during the first phase of the construction of what it then designated as the Miyazaki Line, and later, in 1917, as the Miyazaki Main Line. On 6 December 1932, the same stretch was separated out and was designated as the Kitto Line with Miyakonojō as the starting point. On 1 March 1951, the station name was changed from Kobayashimachi to Kobayashi. With the privatization of Japanese National Railways (JNR), the successor of JGR, on 1 April 1987, Kobayashi came under the control of JR Kyushu.

On 15 March 2015, a new station building was opened, situated between the tracks and adjacent to the island platform. Together with this, a new level crossing provided access to the station building as well as facilitating pedestrian crossing of the tracks was constructed. In October 2016, the old station building, a wooden Japanese style structure, was demolished. A community centre "KITTO Kobayashi" was built on the site (see below).

Passenger statistics
In fiscal 2016, the station was used by an average of 458 passengers daily (boarding passengers only), and it ranked 253rd among the busiest stations of JR Kyushu.

Surrounding area
KITTO Kobayashi - built on the site of the old station building, KITTO is a municipal building housing tourist information offices as well as a community centre with rentable function rooms and also serves as a bus station.

See also
List of railway stations in Japan

References

External links

  

Railway stations in Miyazaki Prefecture
Railway stations in Japan opened in 1912